Haritana Adarsha Secondary School is a high school located at Patharghata Upazila in Barguna District, Bangladesh. This school follows curriculum of Barisal Education Board. It is a semi-public educational institution located at Haritana village. It was founded by some wealthy locals in 1979. The school offers grades from class VI to class X.

History
The school was established in 1979 as a junior high school with the some wealthy local persons. It was recognised by government on 1 June 1981. Indigenous people helped to build this school. In 1995 it was started as a secondary school and was recognised on 1 January 1995.

References

High schools in Bangladesh